Jordan Michael Wright (born October 7, 1991) is an American mixed martial artist who competes in the Middleweight division. He formely fought in the Ultimate Fighting Championship.

Background
Wright started gymnastics at age 4, but after watching the anime Dragon Ball Z, he developed an interest in martial arts. Trying karate as his first martial art, he would then try his hand in wushu, muay Thai and kickboxing. After participating in some muay Thai smokers at the age of 16, he was instantly hooked. After high school, Wright decided to make fighting a full-time job and moved to New Mexico and tried out for Jackson-Wink MMA.  After passing the tryout, Wright would sleep and live at the gym during the summer before his freshman year at the University of New Mexico.

Mixed martial arts career

Early career
Soon after graduating from college, Wright made his professional MMA debut at 23 years old under the banner of Xplode Fight Series. He was victorious, submitting John Lee with a rear-naked choke in just 63 seconds. Wright would go on to win his next seven bouts, none lasting longer than 2:48. At LFA 30 on January 12, 2018, Wright submitted Craig Wilkerson in 1 minute and 29 seconds.

Fighting under the banner of Dana White's Contender Series 10, he faced Anthony Hernandez. Despite losing the fight in 40 seconds, the fight would be declared a no contest, as Hernandez tested positive for marijuana.

Wright faced Gabriel Checco at LFA 80 on January 17, 2020. He won the bout via TKO in the second round.

Ultimate Fighting Championship
Wright made his UFC debut on short notice, as a replacement for Jorge Gonzalez, against Ike Villanueva on August 22, 2020 at UFC on ESPN: Munhoz vs. Edgar. Wright won after cutting Isaac badly with a knee, leading to a doctor's stoppage.

Wright faced Joaquin Buckley  at UFC 255 on November 21, 2020. He lost the fight via knockout in round two.

Wright faced Jamie Pickett on May 15, 2021 at UFC 262. He won the bout via TKO in the first round.

Wright was scheduled to face Julian Marquez on October 16, 2021 at UFC Fight Night 195. At the weigh-ins, it was announced that Marquez was pulled from the bout due to non-COVID related health issues and the fight was canceled.

Wright faced Bruno Silva on December 11, 2021 at UFC 269. He lost the fight via TKO in the first round.

Wright was scheduled to face  Roman Kopylov on April 23, 2022 at UFC Fight Night 205. However Kopylov  withdrew due to medical reasons and he was replaced by Marc-André Barriault. Wright lost the fight via a guillotine choke in round one.

Wright faced Duško Todorović on October 15, 2022, at UFC Fight Night 212. He lost the fight via technical knockout in round two. This fight earned him the Fight of the Night award.

Wright faced Zac Pauga on February 18, 2023 at UFC Fight Night 219. He lost the fight via unanimous decision.

After the loss, it was announced that Wright was no longer on the UFC roster.

Championships and accomplishments

Mixed martial arts
Ultimate Fighting Championship
Fight of the Night (One time)

Mixed martial arts record

|-
|Loss
|align=center|12–5 (1)
|Zac Pauga
|Decision (unanimous)
|UFC Fight Night: Andrade vs. Blanchfield
|
|align=center|3
|align=center|5:00
|Las Vegas, Nevada, United States
|
|-
|Loss
|align=center|12–4 (1)
|Duško Todorović
|TKO (punches and elbows)
|UFC Fight Night: Grasso vs. Araújo
|
|align=center|2
|align=center|3:12
|Las Vegas, Nevada, United States
|
|-
|Loss
|align=center|12–3 (1)
|Marc-André Barriault
|Submission (guillotine choke)
|UFC Fight Night: Lemos vs. Andrade
|
|align=center|1
|align=center|2:36
|Las Vegas, Nevada, United States
|
|-
|Loss
|align=center|12–2 (1)
|Bruno Silva
|TKO (punches)
|UFC 269
|
|align=center|1
|align=center|1:28
|Las Vegas, Nevada, United States
|  
|-
|Win
|align=center|12–1 (1)
|Jamie Pickett
|TKO (elbows and punches)
|UFC 262
|
|align=center|1
|align=center|1:04
|Houston, Texas, United States
|
|-
|Loss
|align=center|11–1 (1)
|Joaquin Buckley
|KO (punches)
|UFC 255
|
|align=center|2
|align=center|0:18
|Las Vegas, Nevada, United States
| 
|-
| Win
| align=center| 11–0 (1)
| Ike Villanueva
| TKO (doctor stoppage)
| UFC on ESPN: Munhoz vs. Edgar
|
|align=Center|1
|align=center|1:31
|Las Vegas, Nevada, United States
|
|-
| Win
| align=center| 
| Gabriel Checco
| TKO (knee and punches)
|LFA 80
|
| align=center|2
| align=center|0:48
|Albuquerque, New Mexico, United States
|
|-
|NC
| align=center| 9–0 (1)
|Anthony Hernandez
|NC (overturned)
|Dana White's Contender Series 10
|
|align=center|1
|align=center|0:40
|Las Vegas, Nevada, United States
|
|-
| Win
| align=center|9–0
| Craig Wilkerson
| Submission (rear-naked choke)
|LFA 30
|
|align=center|1
|align=center|1:29
|Costa Mesa, California, United States
|
|-
| Win
| align=center|8–0
| John Stern
| Submission (rear-naked choke)	
| Alaska FC 131
| 
| align=center|1
| align=center|2:03
| Anchorage, Alaska, United States
|
|-
| Win
| align=center| 7–0
| John Stern
| Submission (arm-triangle choke)
| Alaska FC 128
| 
| align=center| 1
| align=center| 1:32
| Anchorage, Alaska, United States
| 
|-
| Win
| align=center| 6–0
| Julian Hernandez
| TKO (punches)
| Gladiator Challenge: Young Gunz
|
|align=Center|1
|align=center|0:39
|San Jacinto, California, United States
| 
|-
| Win
| align=center| 5–0
| Edward Darby
| TKO (spinning back kick)
|XFS: Payback
|
|align=center|1
|align=center|0:10
|Valley Center, California, United States
|
|-
| Win
| align=center| 4–0
| Andrew Wright
| TKO (punches)
|XFS: Heat
|
|align=center|1
|align=center|1:59
|Valley Center, California, United States
| 
|-
| Win
| align=center| 3–0
| Toby O'Neil
| TKO (leg kicks)
| XFS: Taco
| 
| align=center| 1
| align=center| 0:52
| Valley Center, California, United States
| 
|-
| Win
| align=center| 2–0
| Ramon Dawson
| Submission (rear-naked choke)
| XFS: Hurricane Pro
| 
| align=center| 1
| align=center| 2:48
| Valley Center, California, United States
|
|-
| Win
| align=center| 1–0
| John Lee
| Submission (rear-naked choke)
| XFS: Wasteland
| 
| align=center| 1
| align=center| 1:03
| Valley Center, California, United States
|

See also 
 List of current UFC fighters
 List of male mixed martial artists

References

External links 
  
 

1991 births
Living people
American male mixed martial artists
Middleweight mixed martial artists
Mixed martial artists utilizing karate
Mixed martial artists utilizing Muay Thai
Mixed martial artists utilizing silat
Mixed martial artists utilizing wushu
American male karateka
American Muay Thai practitioners
American wushu practitioners
Ultimate Fighting Championship male fighters